Avenue Berthelot is a street in the 7th (Guillotière) and 8th arrondissement (Bachut) of Lyon which connects the Galliéni bridge at the east to the A43 highway via the avenue Jean Mermoz which extends it to the west.

History 
Formerly named avenue des Ponts as it was drawn as an extension of the two Ponts Napoléon (currently named Pont Galliéni and Pont Kitchner), the street acquired its current name on 25 March 1907, after the chemist Marcellin Berthelot who had died on 18 March 1907. In 1923, there were 351 numbers in the avenue. A part of the avenue Berthelot was renamed rue Paul Painlevé on 11 March 1935. In 1939, another part was renamed avenue Jean Mermoz and rue Paul Painlevé was incorporated into this new avenue. At number 59, there was the Châlet Russe which was destroyed by bombing on 26 May 1944. The present church in this avenue was inaugurated on 4 November 1961.

Description
The avenue runs along the old école de Santé des Armées, now named Centre Berthelot. It is located at number 18 and was built under the direction of Abraham Hirsch.

Major axis of east-west traffic of the south of the city, its automobile attendance declined sharply since the construction of the tram line T2. Motorists have now just two lanes (one-way east-west) along its entire length, the tram enjoying the other half of the roadway.

This avenue connects to the A7 highway to the A43 highway. Notable monuments of this avenue are Centre Berthelot, the Cimetières de la Guillotière, Le Comoedia cinema and the Halte Jean Macé.

References

7th arrondissement of Lyon
8th arrondissement of Lyon
Berthelot